Darling is a 2021 Indian Marathi language romantic comedy film written and directed by Sameer Asha Patil under the banner of 7 Horse Entertainment Pvt Ltd., V.Patke Films and Kathakar Motion Pictures. The film starring Prathamesh Parab, Ritika Shrotri and Nikhil Chavan depicts the comic love story of three characters in a village of Maharashtra. It was theatrically released on 10 December 2021.

Cast
Prathamesh Parab as Tushar
 Ritika Shrotri as Babli
 Nikhil Chavan
 Mangesh Kadam
 Aabha Velankar
 Jaywant Wadkar
 Amey Barve
 Sunil Deo
 Harsha Gupte
 Umesh Bolake
 Santosh Padmini Mane
Special appearance
 Anand Ingale

Release
The film was initially slated to release on 7 January 2021 but pushed to 26 January, which was also postponed due to COVID-19 pandemic. It was released theatrically on 10 December 2021 by Pickle Entertainment.

Soundtrack

Soundtrack of the film is composed by Chinar - Mahesh and lyrics are penned by Sameer Samant, Mandar Cholkar, Mangesh Kangane and Mahesh Ogale. The songs are sung by Ravindra Khomne, Shubhangi Kedar, Chinar Kharkar and Sonali Patel.

References

External links
 

2021 films
2021 romantic comedy films
Indian romantic comedy films
2020s Marathi-language films
Films postponed due to the COVID-19 pandemic